The Slave Hunters is a 2010 South Korean action historical drama set in the Joseon Dynasty about a slave hunter (played by Jang Hyuk) who is tracking down a general-turned-runaway slave (Oh Ji-ho) as well as searching for the woman he loves (Lee Da-hae). It aired on KBS2 from January 6 to March 25, 2010 on Wednesdays and Thursdays at 21:55 for 24 episodes.

An adequate display of muscular brawn, intricate yet gritty fight scenes, bawdy humor and eloquent moments of pathos and humanity made the series both visually and intellectually appealing to audiences. Critics gave special mention to director Kwak Jung-hwan's lush cinematography, the use of a Red One camera giving each shot its theater-worthy luster. The hit series topped the ratings chart for 7 consecutive weeks, averaging 31.7% and reaching a peak of 35.9%.

In 2010, the series was honored at the Seoul International Drama Awards, and the KBS Drama Awards (notably the highest prize Daesang for lead actor Jang Hyuk). Jang also received a best actor nomination from the 2011 International Emmy Awards for his performance.

Synopsis
Set during the Joseon Dynasty, The Slave Hunters follows the story of Lee Dae-gil, Song Tae-ha, and Kim Hye-won.

Lee Dae-gil is a man from a noble family, whose life is ruined by Keun-nom (큰놈이, literally "Big One"), a slave owned by Dae-gil's family. Because Keun-nom's sister Un-nyun and the young master Dae-gil are in love, Dae-gil's parents lock Un-nyun in a shed and leave her to die of dehydration. So Keun-nom burns down Dae-gil's house while rescuing her, then uses a sickle to slash Dae-gil's face. The house collapses shortly after, and Keun-nom and Un-nyun believe Dae-gil to be dead.

Keun-nom runs away with Un-nyun and eventually accumulates enough wealth to buy the Jokbo of a noble family to change his identity. Under his new identity as the member of the noble Kim family, he then changes his name to Kim Seong-hwan and his sister Un-nyun's name to Kim Hye-won.

Driven by his desire for revenge as well as his obsession/love for Un-nyun, Dae-gil endures ten harsh years on the street and makes his name as a slave hunter. Dae-gil carries a sketch of Un-nyun at all times and searches for her wherever he goes.

Song Tae-ha is a military general who has spent years serving Crown Prince Sohyeon, who was living in China as a political hostage after Joseon lost the war with the Qing Dynasty. Upon their release to Joseon, they find themselves embroiled in an even bigger political turmoil. The crown prince dies under suspicious circumstances shortly after returning to Joseon, the crown princess and two of his three young sons are also killed while the youngest son is exiled on Cheju island. Tae-ha is framed for stealing military rations and is demoted to a slave along with his loyal subordinates.

When Tae-ha learns that the exiled youngest son of the late prince, who he believes to be the only rightful heir to the crown, is in danger, he is determined to protect him and have him declared the new crown prince. He escapes forced labor and sets off his journey to Jeju island. Along the way, Tae-ha comes across Hye-won/Un-nyun, who is on the run from an arranged marriage to a powerful noble, and saves her from danger. Dae-gil is hired to capture Tae-ha and chases after him, who, unbeknownst to Dae-gil, is now traveling and starting a romantic relationship with the woman for whom he has been obsessively searching for ten years.

Cast

Main
Jang Hyuk as Lee Dae-gil   
Oh Ji-ho as Song Tae-ha  
Lee Da-hae as Un-nyun / Kim Hye-won  
Gong Hyung-jin as Eop-bok
Lee Jong-hyuk as Hwang Chul-woong
Han Jung-soo as Janggoon Choi ("General Choi")
Kim Ji-seok as Wang-son ("big hand")
Sung Dong-il as Chun Ji-ho
Kim Eung-soo as Lee Gyeong-sik
Kim Ha-eun as Seol-hwa

Supporting

Min Ji-ah as Cho-bok
Yoon Gi-won as Won Ki-yoon
Danny Ahn as Baek-ho
Yoon Ji-min as Yoon-ji
Jo Jae-wan as Keun-nom / Kim Seong-hwan
Ahn Suk-hwan as Hwabaek Bang
Lee Han-wi as Pogyo Oh
Yoon Mun-sik as Horse doctor
Jo Mi-ryung as Keun Jumo ("elder hostess")
Yoon Joo-hee as Jakeun Jumo ("young hostess")
Cho Jin-woong as Kwak Han-seom
Park Ki-woong as Geu boon ("that person")
Kim Ha-yoon as Crown Princess Kang
Yoon Dong-hwan as Long Guda (General Qing)
Kim Young-ae as Mogabi
Kim Kap-soo as King Injo
Ha Si-eun as Lee Sun-young (Chul-woong's wife)
Jo Sung-il as Lee Kwang-jae
Kim Jin-woo  as Lee Seok-gyeon
Kang Sung-min as Crown Prince Sohyeon
Lee In as Grand Prince Bongrim
Lee Dae-ro as Im Yeong-ho
Choi Deok-moon as Seonbi Jo
Joo Da-young as Eun-sil
Ahn Gil-kang as Jjak-gui ("slat ear")
Yoon Jin-ho as Park Jong-soo
Kim Young-ok as Chul-woong's mother
Song Seo-yeon as Kisaeng Chan
Go Joon-hee as Je-ni
Wi Yang-ho as Bandit boss 
Lee Dae-yeon as Bhikkhu Myung-ahn
Jo Hee-bong as Kkeut-bong
Sa Hyun-jin as Jang Pil-soon
Park Hee-jin as Village woman
Hwang Hyeon-hee as Spy at the inn
Kim Kyeong-jin as Boatman
Jang Dong-min as Bookstore owner
Jung Ho-bin as General Shin 
Jeon Se-hyeon as Wang-son's lover

Special appearances
Lee Won-jong as Double-acting slave at the training site
Yoo Chae-yeong as Wang-son's lover
Choi Cheol-ho as Monk inside the jail
Oh Ji-heon as Bandit 
Jo Sung-ha as Lee Jae-joon
Marco as Yangban 
Kim Sung-soo as Citizen
Kim Chang-ryul as Citizen
Lee Ha-neul as Citizen
Han Min-kwan as Citizen

Original soundtrack

Ratings

Source: TNS Media Korea

Awards and nominations

See also
 Conspiracy in the Court (2007)
 List of films featuring slavery

References

External links 
  
 
 
 

 

Korean Broadcasting System television dramas
2010 South Korean television series debuts
2010 South Korean television series endings
Korean-language television shows
Television series set in the Joseon dynasty
South Korean historical television series
South Korean action television series
Television series by Chorokbaem Media